In classical electromagnetism, reciprocity refers to a variety of related theorems involving the interchange of time-harmonic electric current densities (sources) and the resulting electromagnetic fields in Maxwell's equations for time-invariant linear media under certain constraints. Reciprocity is closely related to the concept of symmetric operators from linear algebra, applied to electromagnetism.

Perhaps the most common and general such theorem is Lorentz reciprocity (and its various special cases such as Rayleigh-Carson reciprocity),  named after work by Hendrik Lorentz in 1896 following analogous results regarding sound by Lord Rayleigh and light by Helmholtz (Potton, 2004). Loosely, it states that the relationship between an oscillating current and the resulting electric field is unchanged if one interchanges the points where the current is placed and where the field is measured.  For the specific case of an electrical network, it is sometimes phrased as the statement that voltages and currents at different points in the network can be interchanged. More technically, it follows that the mutual impedance of a first circuit due to a second is the same as the mutual impedance of the second circuit due to the first.

Reciprocity is useful in optics, which (apart from quantum effects) can be expressed in terms of classical electromagnetism, but also in terms of radiometry.

There is also an analogous theorem in electrostatics, known as Green's reciprocity, relating the interchange of electric potential and electric charge density.

Forms of the reciprocity theorems are used in many electromagnetic applications, such as analyzing electrical networks and antenna systems.
For example, reciprocity implies that antennas work equally well as transmitters or receivers, and specifically that an antenna's radiation and receiving patterns are identical. Reciprocity is also a basic lemma that is used to prove other theorems about electromagnetic systems, such as the symmetry of the impedance matrix and scattering matrix, symmetries of Green's functions for use in boundary-element and transfer-matrix computational methods, as well as orthogonality properties of harmonic modes in waveguide systems (as an alternative to proving those properties directly from the symmetries of the eigen-operators).

Lorentz reciprocity 
Specifically, suppose that one has a current density  that produces an electric field  and a magnetic field  where all three are periodic functions of time with angular frequency , and in particular they have time-dependence  Suppose that we similarly have a second current  at the same frequency  which (by itself) produces fields  and  The Lorentz reciprocity theorem then states, under certain simple conditions on the materials of the medium described below, that for an arbitrary surface  enclosing a volume :

Equivalently, in differential form (by the divergence theorem):

This general form is commonly simplified for a number of special cases. In this case, if one integrates throughout space then the surface-integral terms cancel (see below) and one obtains:

This result (along with the following simplifications) is sometimes called the Rayleigh-Carson reciprocity theorem, after Lord Rayleigh's work on sound waves and an extension by Carson (1924; 1930) to applications for radio frequency antennas. Often, one further simplifies this relation by considering point-like dipole sources, in which case the integrals disappear and one simply has the product of the electric field with the corresponding dipole moments of the currents. Or, for wires of negligible thickness, one obtains the applied current in one wire multiplied by the resulting voltage across another and vice versa; see also below.

Another special case of the Lorentz reciprocity theorem applies when the volume  entirely contains both of the localized sources (or alternatively if  intersects neither of the sources). In this case:

Reciprocity for electrical networks 

Above, Lorentz reciprocity was phrased in terms of an externally applied current source and the resulting field. Often, especially for electrical networks, one instead prefers to think of an externally applied voltage and the resulting currents. The Lorentz reciprocity theorem describes this case as well, assuming ohmic materials (i.e. currents that respond linearly to the applied field) with a 3×3 conductivity matrix  that is required to be symmetric, which is implied by the other conditions below.  In order to properly describe this situation, one must carefully distinguish between the externally applied fields (from the driving voltages) and the total fields that result (King, 1963).

If this external current is in a material with a conductivity , then it corresponds to an externally applied electric field  where, by definition of :

For the limit of thin wires, this gives the product of the externally applied voltage (1) multiplied by the resulting total current (2) and vice versa. In particular, the Rayleigh-Carson reciprocity theorem becomes a simple summation:

where  and  denote the complex amplitudes of the AC applied voltages and the resulting currents, respectively, in a set of circuit elements (indexed by ) for two possible sets of voltages  and  

or in words:
The current at position (1) from a voltage at (2) is identical to the current at (2) from the same voltage at (1).

Conditions and proof of Lorentz reciprocity

where

is usually a symmetric operator under the "inner product"  for vector fields  and 
(Technically, this unconjugated form is not a true inner product because it is not real-valued for complex-valued fields, but that is not a problem here. In this sense, the operator is not truly Hermitian but is rather complex-symmetric.) This is true whenever the permittivity  and the magnetic permeability , at the given , are symmetric 3×3 matrices (symmetric rank-2 tensors) – this includes the common case where they are scalars (for isotropic media), of course. They need not be real – complex values correspond to materials with losses, such as conductors with finite conductivity  (which is included in  via ) – and because of this, the reciprocity theorem does not require time reversal invariance. The condition of symmetric  and  matrices is almost always satisfied; see below for an exception.

For any Hermitian operator  under an inner product , we have  by definition, and the Rayleigh-Carson reciprocity theorem is merely the vectorial version of this statement for this particular operator  that is,  The Hermitian property of the operator here can be derived by integration by parts. For a finite integration volume, the surface terms from this integration by parts yield the more-general surface-integral theorem above. In particular, the key fact is that, for vector fields  and  integration by parts (or the divergence theorem) over a volume  enclosed by a surface  gives the identity:

Conditions and proof of Lorenz reciprocity using Maxwell's equations and vector operations

  

Let us take a region in which dielectric constant and permeability may be functions of position but not of time. Maxwell's equations, written in terms of the total fields, currents and charges of the region describe the electromagnetic behavior of the region. The two curl equations are:

Under steady constant frequency conditions we get from the two curl equations the Maxwell's equations for the Time-Periodic case:

The complex vector multipliers of  may be called vector phasors by analogy to the complex scalar quantities which are commonly referred to as phasors.

An equivalence of vector operations shows that 
 for every vectors  and 

If products in the Time-Periodic equations are taken as indicated by this last equivalence, and added,

This now may be integrated over the volume of concern,
 

 

This form is valid for general media, but in the common case of linear, isotropic, time-invariant materials,  is a scalar independent of time. Then generally as physical magnitudes  and 

Last equation then becomes
 

In an exactly analogous way we get for vectors  and  the following expression:
 

Subtracting the two last equations by members we get

and equivalently in differential form 
 Q.E.D.

Surface-term cancellation
The cancellation of the surface terms on the right-hand side of the Lorentz reciprocity theorem, for an integration over all space, is not entirely obvious but can be derived in a number of ways. A rigorous treatment of the surface integral takes into account the causality of interacting wave field states: The surface-integral contribution at infinity vanishes for the time-convolution interaction of two causal wave fields only (the time-correlation interaction leads to a non-zero contribution). 

Another simple argument would be that the fields goes to zero at infinity for a localized source, but this argument fails in the case of lossless media: in the absence of absorption, radiated fields decay inversely with distance, but the surface area of the integral increases with the square of distance, so the two rates balance one another in the integral.

Instead, it is common (e.g. King, 1963) to assume that the medium is homogeneous and isotropic sufficiently far away. Then it follows that  which by a simple vector identity equals  Similarly,  and the two terms cancel one another.

The above argument shows explicitly why the surface terms can cancel, but lacks generality. Alternatively, one can treat the case of lossless surrounding media with radiation boundary conditions imposed via the limiting absorption principle: Taking the limit as the losses (the imaginary part of ) go to zero. For any nonzero loss, the fields decay exponentially with distance and the surface integral vanishes, regardless of whether the medium is homogeneous. Since the left-hand side of the Lorentz reciprocity theorem vanishes for integration over all space with any non-zero losses, it must also vanish in the limit as the losses go to zero. (Note that this approach implicitly imposes the Sommerfeld radiation condition of zero incoming waves from infinity, because otherwise even an infinitesimal loss would eliminate the incoming waves and the limit would not give the lossless solution.)

Reciprocity and Green's function

Lossless magneto-optic materials
In this case, the operator  is Hermitian under the conjugated inner product  and a variant of the reciprocity theorem still holds:

For the special case of  this gives a re-statement of conservation of energy or Poynting's theorem (since here we have assumed lossless materials, unlike above): The time-average rate of work done by the current (given by the real part of ) is equal to the time-average outward flux of power (the integral of the Poynting vector). By the same token, however, the surface terms do not in general vanish if one integrates over all space for this reciprocity variant, so a Rayleigh-Carson form does not hold without additional assumptions.

The fact that magneto-optic materials break Rayleigh-Carson reciprocity is the key to devices such as Faraday isolators and circulators. A current on one side of a Faraday isolator produces a field on the other side but not vice versa.

Generalization to non-symmetric materials

This can be further generalized to bi-anisotropic materials by transposing the full 6×6 susceptibility tensor.

Exceptions to reciprocity
For nonlinear media, no reciprocity theorem generally holds.  Reciprocity also does not generally apply for time-varying ("active") media; for example, when  is modulated in time by some external process. (In both of these cases, the frequency  is not generally a conserved quantity.)

Feld-Tai reciprocity
In 1992, a closely related reciprocity theorem was articulated independently by Y.A. Feld and C.T. Tai,
and is known as Feld-Tai reciprocity or the Feld-Tai lemma. t relates two time-harmonic localized current sources and the resulting magnetic fields:

However, the Feld-Tai lemma is only valid under much more restrictive conditions than Lorentz reciprocity. It generally requires time-invariant linear media with an isotropic homogeneous impedance, i.e. a constant scalar / ratio, with the possible exception of regions of perfectly conducting material.

As above, one can also construct a more general formulation for integrals over a finite volume.

Optical reciprocity in radiometric terms

Apart from quantal effects, classical theory covers near-, middle-, and far-field electric and magnetic phenomena with arbitrary time courses. Optics refers to far-field nearly-sinusoidal oscillatory electromagnetic effects. Instead of paired electric and magnetic variables, optics, including optical reciprocity, can be expressed in polarization-paired radiometric variables, such as spectral radiance, traditionally called specific intensity.

In 1856, Hermann von Helmholtz wrote:

"A ray of light proceeding from point  arrives at point  after suffering any number of refractions, reflections, &c. At point  let any two perpendicular planes ,  be taken in the direction of the ray; and let the vibrations of the ray be divided into two parts, one in each of these planes. Take like planes ,  in the ray at point ; then the following proposition may be demonstrated.

This is sometimes called the Helmholtz reciprocity (or reversion) principle. When the wave propagates through a material acted upon by an applied magnetic field, reciprocity can be broken so this principle will not apply. Similarly, when there are moving objects in the path of the ray, the principle may be entirely inapplicable. Historically, in 1849, Sir George Stokes stated his optical reversion principle without attending to polarization.

Like the principles of thermodynamics, this principle is reliable enough to use as a check on the correct performance of experiments, in contrast with the usual situation in which the experiments are tests of a proposed law.

The simplest statement of the principle is if I can see you, then you can see me. The principle was used by Gustav Kirchhoff in his derivation of his law of thermal radiation and by Max Planck in his analysis of his law of thermal radiation.

For ray-tracing global illumination algorithms, incoming and outgoing light can be considered as reversals of each other, without affecting the bidirectional reflectance distribution function (BRDF) outcome.

Green's reciprocity
Whereas the above reciprocity theorems were for oscillating fields, Green's reciprocity is an analogous theorem for electrostatics with a fixed distribution of electric charge (Panofsky and Phillips, 1962).

In particular, let  denote the electric potential resulting from a total charge density .  The electric potential satisfies Poisson's equation, where  is the vacuum permittivity.  Similarly, let  denote the electric potential resulting from a total charge density , satisfying .  In both cases, we assume that the charge distributions are localized, so that the potentials can be chosen to go to zero at infinity.  Then, Green's reciprocity theorem states that, for integrals over all space:

This theorem is easily proven from Green's second identity. Equivalently, it is the statement that
 
i.e. that  is a Hermitian operator (as follows by integrating by parts twice).

See also
Surface equivalence principle

References

 L. D. Landau and E. M. Lifshitz, Electrodynamics of Continuous Media (Addison-Wesley: Reading, MA, 1960). §89.
 Ronold W. P. King, Fundamental Electromagnetic Theory (Dover: New York, 1963).   	§IV.21.
 C. Altman and K. Such, Reciprocity, Spatial Mapping and Time Reversal in Electromagnetics (Kluwer: Dordrecht, 1991).
 H. A. Lorentz, "The theorem of Poynting concerning the energy in the electromagnetic field and two general propositions concerning the propagation of light," Amsterdammer Akademie der Wetenschappen 4 p. 176 (1896).
 R. J. Potton, "Reciprocity in optics," Reports on Progress in Physics 67, 717-754 (2004).  (A review article on the history of this topic.)
 J. R. Carson, "A generalization of reciprocal theorem," Bell System Technical Journal 3 (3), 393-399 (1924).
 J. R. Carson, "The reciprocal energy theorem," ibid. 9 (4), 325-331 (1930).
 Ya. N. Feld, "On the quadratic lemma in electrodynamics," Sov. Phys—Dokl. 37, 235-236 (1992).
 C.-T. Tai, "Complementary reciprocity theorems in electromagnetic theory," IEEE Trans. Antennas Prop. 40 (6), 675-681 (1992).
 Wolfgang K. H. Panofsky and Melba Phillips, Classical Electricity and Magnetism (Addison-Wesley: Reading, MA, 1962).
 M. Stumpf,  Electromagnetic Reciprocity in Antenna Theory (Wiley-IEEE Press: Piscataway, NJ: 2018).
 M. Stumpf, Time-Domain Electromagnetic Reciprocity in Antenna Modeling (Wiley-IEEE Press: Piscataway, NJ: 2020).
 Viktar Asadchy, Mohammad S. Mirmoosa, Ana Díaz-Rubio, Shanhui Fan, Sergei A. Tretyakov, Tutorial on Electromagnetic Nonreciprocity and Its Origins, arXiv:2001.04848 (2020).

Citations

Electromagnetism
Circuit theorems